This is a list of films which placed number one at the weekend box office for the year 2019 in Spain.

See also
 List of Spanish films — Spanish films by year

References

2019

Spain